At the 1948 Winter Olympics, two bobsleigh events were contested. The two-man competition was held on Friday, January 30, 1948 and on Saturday, January 31, 1948 while the four-man competition was held on Friday, February 6, 1948 and on Saturday, February 7, 1948.

Medal summary

Participating nations
Twenty-one bobsledders competed in both events.

A total of 71 bobsledders from nine nations competed at the St. Moritz Games:

Medal table

References

External links
International Olympic Committee results database
1948 bobsleigh two-man results
1948 bobsleigh four-man results

 
1948 Winter Olympics
1948 Winter Olympics events
Olympics
Bobsleigh in Switzerland